Surrender is a 1987 American comedy film that was written and directed by Jerry Belson. It stars Sally Field, Michael Caine, Steve Guttenberg, Peter Boyle,  Iman, and Jackie Cooper in his final film role.

Plot
Sean Stein is a successful novelist, but after two divorces and a palimony suit, he now believes women only have loved him for his money. At a charity ball where armed thieves order guests to strip, he is bound nude to a commercial artist named Daisy Morgan. He is immediately attracted to her.

Daisy is in a rather rocky relationship with Marty, a whiny, unstable lawyer who is afraid to make a commitment. Sean does not know she already has a well-off boyfriend, but he decides to play a little trick to win her. With the help of his lawyer, Jay Bass, he pretends to be a poor failure to see if she will love him for himself. As their relationship develops, he ultimately decides to reveal his true self. But on that very day, Marty persuades Daisy that he is a changed man and that they should live together in his home. Sean is heartbroken.

On moving day, Daisy accidentally sees a newspaper clipping that reveals Sean's true identity. She demands an explanation, which she accepts, telling him she realized that he is who she truly loves. However, he wonders if she only decided this after reading the article about his success and seeing his Beverly Hills home. She lies.

They elope to Lake Tahoe to be married. On the way, Sean urges her to sign a prenuptial agreement. She thinks it's "unromantic" but concedes. In a casino in Nevada, gambling by herself, she then miraculously hits a jackpot on a slot machine, winning two million dollars.

Sean returns to say he has had a change of heart and requires no prenup. Now it is Daisy who wants to know when exactly he decided this. She admits lying to him before. Marty shows up and begs her to return to him. Sean says, "You can have her."

Back in Los Angeles, realizing she has made a mistake, Daisy rejects a proposal of marriage and pays off Marty for his trouble with some of her casino winnings.

A disturbed Sean spots a prostitute who robbed him. He decides to avenge himself against women in general by bringing the prostitute to his home and robbing her. He turns out to be a transvestite. Daisy suddenly bursts in and wants to marry him again, throwing all of her remaining casino winnings at him. The prostitute picks up his gun and sees the pile of cash, but generously says, "I'll only take cab fare."

Cast
 Sally Field as Daisy Morgan
 Michael Caine as Sean Stein
 Steve Guttenberg as Marty
 Peter Boyle as Jay
 Jackie Cooper as Ace Morgan, Daisy's father 
 Julie Kavner as Ronnie
 Louise Lasser as Joyce
 Iman as Hedy

Filming
Much of the film was shot in Stateline, Nevada in November 1986.

References

External links
 
 
 
 

1987 films
1987 comedy films
1987 LGBT-related films
Films about writers
Golan-Globus films
Transgender-related films
Films directed by Jerry Belson
Films with screenplays by Jerry Belson
Films scored by Michel Colombier
American LGBT-related films
LGBT-related comedy films
Warner Bros. films
1980s English-language films
1980s American films